Emilie Trouche (born 17 August 1985) is a French former professional tennis player.

Trouche made her only WTA Tour main draw appearance at the 2003 SEAT Open, partnering Russian Vera Dushevina in the doubles. But First Round lost French Émilie Loit and Australian Nicole Pratt.

ITF finals

Doubles: 2 (2–0)

References

External links
 
 

1985 births
Living people
French female tennis players